The Council of International Schools (CIS) is a membership organization aimed at international education.

CIS was formed in 1949. It has over 1,360 institutional members consisting of over 740 schools and 610 colleges/universities, located in 122 countries. Many international schools in countries around the world are members. The services of CIS include international educational accreditation.

The CIS headquarters are in Leiden, The Netherlands. CIS's legal name is Council of International Schools, Inc. and it is a "not-for-profit" company registered in the state of Delaware in the United States.

To be CIS Accredited, a school pays the membership fee and then a "registration fee" of €2,140. Once CIS Accredited, the school then pays €4,350 annually. Evaluation of the school takes place every five years.

See also
 International school

References

External links
 CIS website
 

Organizations established in 1949
International educational organizations
Educational organisations based in the Netherlands
Professional associations based in the Netherlands
Associations of schools
Accreditation organizations
School accreditors
Leiden